Ye Jianying (28 April 1897 – 22 October 1986) was a Chinese Communist revolutionary leader and politician, one of the founding Ten Marshals of the People's Republic of China. He was the top military leader in the 1976 coup that overthrew the Gang of Four and ended the Cultural Revolution, and was the key supporter of Deng Xiaoping in his power struggle with Hua Guofeng. After Deng ascended power, in his capacity as Chairman of the Standing Committee of the National People's Congress, Ye served as China's head of state during the period from 1978 to 1983.

Life 
Born Ye Yiwei into a wealthy Christian Hakka merchant family in an old rural village at Jiaying county (modern-day renamed as Meixian District), his courtesy name was Cangbai and most of Ye Jianying's siblings died before being adults due to severe illness.

After graduation from the Yunnan Military Academy in 1919, he joined the Kuomintang (KMT). He taught at the Whampoa Military Academy, and in 1927 joined the Communist Party.

That year, he participated in the failed Nanchang Uprising and was forced to flee to Hong Kong with two other uprising leaders, Zhou Enlai and Ye Ting (no relation), with only a pair of handguns to share between them.  Shortly after, he faithfully carried out his assigned duties during the Guangzhou Uprising, although he had been opposed to it; upon this uprising's failure he was once again obliged to flee to Hong Kong with Ye Ting and Nie Rongzhen.  However, Ye was far more fortunate than Ye Ting, who was made a scapegoat for the Comintern's failures and forced into exile. Ye was not blamed, and subsequently studied military science in Moscow.

After returning to China in 1932 he joined the Jiangxi Soviet, serving as Chief of Staff of Zhang Guotao's Fourth Front Army. However, after Zhang's fighters met up with Mao Zedong's force during the Long March, the two leaders disagreed on the subsequent move of the Chinese Red Army. Zhang insisted on turning southward to establish a new base in the regions inhabited by Tibetan and Qiang minorities. (This later proved to be a disaster, as Mao had anticipated, with Zhang losing over 75% of his men and retreating to the Communist base at yan'an.)  During the two leaders' disagreement, Ye – though he was Zhang's Chief of Staff – sided with Mao; and instead of supporting Zhang unconditionally as he had during the Guangzhou Uprising, Ye absconded to Mao's headquarters with Zhang's code books and maps.  As a result, Zhang's communications with Comintern were cut, while Mao was able to establish a radio link, leading to Comintern's acceptance of Mao's leadership.  Mao would never forget Ye's contribution, observing later that "Ye Jianying saved the (Chinese Communist) Party, the (Chinese) Red Army, and the (Chinese) Revolution".

After the establishment of the People's Republic of China, Ye was placed in charge of Guangdong, which was to cost him his political career under Mao's reign.  Ye understood that the economic conditions in the province were very different from those in the rest of China, since most Cantonese landlords were peasants themselves who participated in production without exploiting their tenants. He therefore declined to dispossess the landlords, and instead protected their businesses and land. However, Ye's policies contradicted the general directives of the Party-mandated land reform, which emphasized class struggle. His policies deemed too soft, Ye and his local cadres were soon replaced by Lin Biao's, and a much harsher policy was implemented and hundreds of thousands of Cantonese landlords were executed, with Ye's political career effectively over.

However, Mao did not forget what Ye had done for him during the Long March, and thus removed him only from political posts while preserving his military positions.  As a result, until 1968, Ye remained active in various military functions, having been made a marshal in 1955.  Ye was clever in using his military influence to provide limited support and he was responsible for interfering with assassination attempts on reformers.

After Lin Biao was overthrown and died in 1971, Ye's influence grew, and in 1975 he was appointed Defense Minister, taking Lin Biao's post. From 1973, he was also a Vice Chairman of the Central Committee of the Chinese Communist Party.

He led the conspiracy of generals and Party elders that overthrew Jiang Qing and the Gang of Four; during initial planning at his residence, he and Li Xiannian communicated by writing, although they sat next to each other, because of the possibility of bugging.

Thanks to Ye's support of Chairman Hua Guofeng, he was confirmed as party vice-chairman at the Eleventh National Congress of the Chinese Communist Party in 1977. Because the physical demands of Defense Minister were too great for the octogenarian Ye, he resigned from that position in 1978 and was appointed Chairman of the Standing Committee of the National People's Congress, filling a post left unoccupied since Zhu De's death in 1976. As such, Ye was China's ceremonial Head of State. Ye retired from this position in 1983 and in 1985 he withdrew completely from the Politburo Standing Committee. He died a little over a year later at the age of 89.

Family 
Ye married six times and had six children. His sons include Ye Xuanping (1924–2019), Ye Xuanning (1938–2016), and Ye Xuanlian (born 1952). Ye's granddaughter Robynn Yip (born 1986), daughter of Xuanlian, is a professional musician based in Hong Kong.

Awards 
 
  Order of Victory of Resistance against Aggression (1946)

 
  Order of August 1 (1st Class Medal) (1955)
  Order of Independence and Freedom (1st Class Medal) (1955)
  Order of Liberation (1st Class Medal) (1955)

References 

|-

|-

|-

|-

|-

|-

1897 births
1986 deaths
Ministers of National Defense of the People's Republic of China
Eighth Route Army generals
X=10
Chinese politicians of Hakka descent
Hakka generals
People from Meixian District
Chinese Communist Party politicians from Guangdong
Chairmen of the Standing Committee of the National People's Congress
Mayors of Beijing
Mayors of Guangzhou
Governors of Guangdong
People's Republic of China politicians from Guangdong
Moscow Sun Yat-sen University alumni
Members of the Secretariat of the Chinese Communist Party
Politicians from Meizhou
20th-century Chinese politicians
Members of the 12th Politburo Standing Committee of the Chinese Communist Party
Members of the 11th Politburo Standing Committee of the Chinese Communist Party
Members of the 10th Politburo Standing Committee of the Chinese Communist Party
Members of the 9th Politburo of the Chinese Communist Party
Members of the 8th Politburo of the Chinese Communist Party
Vice Chairpersons of the National Committee of the Chinese People's Political Consultative Conference
Chinese Christians